A checked swing is a type of motion in baseball made by a batter. A checked swing occurs when a batter starts to swing the bat at the ball, but stops the swing in order to allow the ball to pass without hitting it. If the swing was indeed checked, so that there was no swing, and if the bat did not touch the ball and it did not go through the strike zone, the pitch counts as a ball; but in that circumstance if the swing was not checked, so that a swing occurred, then the pitch counts as a strike.

Initially, the home plate umpire must determine if a swing was checked or not checked. If the umpire indicates that it was checked, an appeal can be made by the catcher or the manager, and the home plate umpire can then make a request to either the 1st or 3rd base umpire to make the call as to whether the swing was indeed checked. To maximize visibility, the 1st base umpire makes the call for right-handed batters, and the 3rd base umpire for left-handed batters. The umpire makes a "safe" gesture to indicate a checked swing or makes a clenched fist to indicate a full swing.

If a ball that passes the batter goes through the strike zone, it is a strike even if a swing is checked. A checked swing sometimes results in an unintentional swinging bunt, where the ball hits the bat and rolls a short distance, even though the batter apparently stopped the swing. If a ball is hit during a checked swing, it is in play as long as it is not ruled a foul ball.

The Major League Baseball rulebook does not contain an official definition for a checked swing, but defines a swing as "an attempt to strike at the ball". It is the decision of the umpire as to whether an attempt was made or not. Generally, factors such as whether the bat passes the front of the plate or the batter pulls the wrists back are considered in the ruling. Some umpires prefer to use the "breaking the wrists" criterion as the method to decide a checked swing: if the wrists "rolled over", a swing occurred.

Checked swinging can also be used in some warm-up exercises, such as the game pepper.

See also
Late leave (cricket)
Final out of the 2021 National League Division Series, a controversial call on an attempted checked swing

References

 MLB

Baseball terminology